Trigonidomimus is a genus of anomalous crickets in the family Gryllidae. There are about five described species in Trigonidomimus recorded from the Americas.

Species
These five species belong to the genus Trigonidomimus:
 Trigonidomimus annuliger (Hebard, 1928)
 Trigonidomimus belfragei Caudell, 1912 (Belfrage's cricket)
 Trigonidomimus comptus (Walker, 1869)
 Trigonidomimus ruficeps Chopard, 1956
 Trigonidomimus zernyi (Chopard, 1931)

References

Further reading

 

Crickets
Articles created by Qbugbot
Orthoptera of South America